Box of Frogs were an English rock band formed in 1983 by former members of the Yardbirds, who released their first album in 1984. The core group consisted of  Chris Dreja, Paul Samwell-Smith, and Jim McCarty. Vocals on their eponymous album were done by John Fiddler (formerly of Medicine Head and British Lions). On the second album, Fiddler sang on five songs, with guests singers Graham Parker, Ian Dury and Roger Chapman performing the remaining songs. Many musicians guested on their albums (including guitarists Rory Gallagher, Earl Slick and Steve Hackett, harmonica player Mark Feltham, and keyboardists Max Middleton and Peter-John Vettese). Former Yardbirds bandmates Jeff Beck and Jimmy Page played lead guitar on parts of their first and second albums, respectively.

The group's formation and unusual band name were explained on the sticker affixed to original LP releases:

The group showed promise on the first album of rock radio friendly tunes, featuring Jeff Beck.  The album was popular on college campuses. Plans were made for a US tour, but it is alleged that Samwell-Smith, Dreja, and McCarty hated the idea of the tour, much to John Fiddler's dismay. Jeff Beck, who along with Dzal Martin was considered as the lead guitarist for such a tour, was reportedly disgusted at his ex-bandmates' refusal to tour America. He took no part on the second album, Strange Land (1986), and Fiddler barely chose to do so before walking out. "Asylum" is one of the few songs Fiddler sang on, and was the only one featuring Page.

The group's two albums, Box of Frogs (1984) and Strange Land (1986), were combined for release on a single CD by Renaissance Records in 1996. AllMusic's Stephen Thomas Erlewine gave the album four and a half out of five stars, although he commented:

Personnel 
 John Fiddler - lead and backing vocals, guitars, percussion, synthesizers
 Chris Dreja - rhythm guitar, percussion, occasional backing vocals
 Paul Samwell-Smith - bass guitar, backing vocals, percussion, synthesizers
 Jim McCarty - drums, percussion, backing vocals, keyboards

Discography

Albums

Box of Frogs (1984)

Track listing

Personnel 
Box of Frogs

 Paul Samwell-Smith - bass guitar, backing vocals, percussion, synthesizer, producer
 Jim McCarty - drums, percussion, backing vocals
 John Fiddler - lead and backing vocals, acoustic and electric guitar, percussion, synthesizer, assistant producer
 Chris Dreja - rhythm guitar, percussion, backing vocals, photography

Additional musicians

 Jeff Beck - lead guitar (tracks 1, 3, 6, 9)
 Ray Majors - lead guitar, backing vocals and percussion (track 2)
 Dzal Martin - lead guitar (tracks 4, 7, 8), slide guitar (track 4)
 Rory Gallagher - slide guitar (tracks 5, 7), electric sitar (track 7)
 Mark Feltham - harmonica (track 1)
 Guy Barker - trumpet (track 7)
 Peter-John Vettese - keyboards (tracks 1, 3), piano (track 8)
 Max Middleton - keyboards (tracks 2, 4, 5, 7)
 Geriant Watkins - piano (track 9)

Production

 Mark Larson - design
 Gary Edwards - overdubs and mixing
 Max Norman - recording engineer 
 Patty Dryden - illustration

Strange Land (1986)

Track listing 

Bonus cassette version tracks:

Personnel 
Box of Frogs

 Paul Samwell-Smith - bass, production, backing vocals
 Jim McCarty - drums, keyboards, backing vocals, percussion
 Chris Dreja - rhythm guitar, percussion
 John Fiddler - vocals on tracks listed above

Additional musicians

 John Knightsbridge - lead guitar (track 1)
 Rory Gallagher - lead guitar (tracks 2, 4, 6), slide guitar (track 4), electric sitar (tracks 5, 6)
 Steve Hackett - lead guitar (tracks 3, 9)
 Dzal Martin - guitar (tracks 4, 7, 9), lead guitar (track 4, 8)
 Jimmy Page - lead guitar (track 7)
 Graham Gouldman - rhythm guitar and backing vocals (track 6)
 Max Middleton - synthesizer (tracks 1, 3), keyboard outro solo (track 3)
 Peter-John Vettese - synthesizer (tracks 2 to 4) emulator synthesizer (track 3, 5, 6, 8, 9), keyboards (track 6)
 Geraint Watkins - piano (track 4)
 David Clayton - keyboards (track 7), synthesizer (track 9)
 Neil Lockwood - backing vocals (track 1)
 Carroll Thompson, Julie Roberts - backing vocals (tracks 2, 4)

Production

 Mark Larson - art direction
 Simon Hanhart - engineer at Battery Studio
 Stephen Street - engineer at island
 Gary Edwards - engineer at Redan Recorders
 Jeremy Allom and Louis Austin - engineers at Ridge Farm
 John H. Howard - illustration
 George Marino - mastering

Singles
"Back Where I Started" / "The Edge" - 1984 (UK)
"Back Where I Started" / "Nine Lives" / "The Edge" - 1984 (UK - 12-inch)
"Into The Dark" / "X-tracks medley": "Two Steps Ahead" / "Just A Boy Again" / "Harder" / "Another Wasted Day" / "Back Where I Started" - 1984 (UK)
"Into The Dark" / "X-tracks medley" - 1984 (UK - 12-inch)
"Two Steps Ahead" / "The Edge" - 1984 (US)
"Two Steps Ahead" / "Two Steps Ahead" - 1984 (US - 12-inch promo)
"Average" / "Strange Land" / "I Keep Calling" - 1986 (UK - 12-inch)
"Heart Full of Soul" - 1986 (Netherlands)

Transcription discs
Interchords - 1984

Notes

References

External links

 

English rock music groups
Musical groups established in 1983
The Yardbirds
Musical groups disestablished in 1986
Epic Records artists
Musical groups from London